Gaston Dron (19 March 1924 – 13 August 2008) was a French cyclist. He was born in Clichy, Hauts-de-Seine. He won a bronze medal in the tandem event at the 1948 Summer Olympics in London, together with René Faye.

References

External links
 
 
 

1924 births
2008 deaths
Sportspeople from Clichy, Hauts-de-Seine
French male cyclists
Cyclists at the 1948 Summer Olympics
Olympic cyclists of France
Olympic bronze medalists for France
Olympic medalists in cycling
Medalists at the 1948 Summer Olympics
Cyclists from Île-de-France